Erridupizir (Erridu-pizir)  (fl. 2141–2138 BC (Short chronology)) was a Gutian ruler in Sumer. His reign was attested by a royal inscription at the archaeological site for the ancient city-state of Nippur where he called himself: "King of Guti, King of the Four Quarters" Thought to be the "king without a name" on the SKL. Imta then succeeded Erridupizir.

After the Akkadian Empire fell to the Gutians, the Lullubians rebelled against Erridupizir, according to the latter's inscriptions:

In another inscription he said "the goddess Aštar had stationed troops in Agade".

See also

 History of Sumer
 List of Mesopotamian dynasties

References

Sumerian kings
22nd-century BC Sumerian kings
Gutian dynasty of Sumer